Nandini Nimbkar is an agricultural scientist from India, and currently the President of the Nimbkar Agricultural Research Institute (NARI). She is the daughter of B. V. Nimbkar and granddaughter of Irawati Karve and Kamala Nimbkar.

Nimbkar started at NARI as a researcher. She became director and then in 1990 president of the institute. Nimkbar has 37 years of experience in agriculture research, and is also a member of the senate and academic council of Shivaji University. She has overseen the setup of a large sweet sorghum breeding program at NARI. Dr. Nimbkar has been recently nominated by Ministry of Agriculture (India), Government of India, as a member of Research Advisory Committee to National Institute of Abiotic Stress Management (NIASM), Baramati, India.

Education
 Bachelor's degree from the University of Pune in 1974.
 Master's degree in Agronomy from the University of Florida in 1977.
 Doctorate in Agronomy from the University of Florida in 1981.
 Honored as one of the 47 most distinguished alumnae of University of Florida in 1997.

References

External links
 Official Website for the Nimbkar Agricultural Research Institute
 Publications of Nandini Nimbkar

Living people
University of Florida College of Agricultural and Life Sciences alumni
American Hindus
Year of birth missing (living people)
American emigrants to India
American people of Marathi descent
Shivaji University
Savitribai Phule Pune University alumni
Women scientists from Maharashtra
Scientists from Maharashtra